Carretera Federal 85D is the designation for toll highways (autopistas) paralleling Federal Highway 85. Two roads are designated Highway 85D, one from Nuevo Laredo, Tamaulipas, to Monterrey, Nuevo León, known as Autopista Monterrey–Nuevo Laredo, and the other from Pachuca, Hidalgo, to Mexico City, known as Autopista Pachuca–Ciudad de México. Both toll routes run parallel to their free alternative, Federal Highway 85. Highway 85D has wider lanes offers a more direct route and is continuously being repaired and repaved unlike the free route.

Autopista Monterrey–Nuevo Laredo

The first segment of Federal Highway 85Da begins when the highway crosses into Nuevo León, on the edge of Anáhuac Municipality, ending near Del Norte International Airport in Apodaca, a suburb of northern Monterrey, where the toll highway merges onto Federal Highway 85. The road is maintained by Caminos y Puentes Federales, with a toll of 219 pesos.

Autopista Pachuca–Ciudad de México

The Autopista Pachuca–Ciudad de México begins north of Tizayuca, Hidalgo, proceeding southwest and ending at an interchange on the border of Ecatepec de Morelos and Tlalnepantla, just shy of Mexico City itself. CAPUFE charges a toll of 47 pesos to use the road.

It serves as the western terminus of Mexican Federal Highway 132D (México-Tuxpan).

2013 road accident

On 7 May 2013, the gas tanker of a tanker truck exploded after it crashed into a guardrail, killing 26 people and injuring 36.

References

085D
085D